Chahe is a town in Weining Yi, Hui, and Miao Autonomous County, Bijie, Guizhou. , it administers the following five residential communities and twelve villages:
Chahe Community 
Jinzhong Community
Yingjiang Community
Libi Community
Yinchang Community
Xin Village
Dahong Village
Shaying Village
Xinfa Village
Xinguang Village
Qiaxi Village
Longtoushan Village
Xinlu Village
Haiping Village
Sanyi Village
Yunsha Village
Hanba Village

References

Weining Yi, Hui, and Miao Autonomous County
Towns in Guizhou